Germany competed at the 2011 World Aquatics Championships in Shanghai, China between July 16 and 31, 2011.

Medalists

Medal summary

Diving

Germany has qualified 11 athletes in diving.

Men

Women

Open water swimming

Men

Women

Team

Swimming

Germany qualified 23 swimmers.

Men

Women

Synchronised swimming

Germany has qualified 2 athletes in synchronised swimming.

Women

Water polo

Men

Team Roster 

Alexander Tchigir
Florian Naroska
Fabian Schroedter
Julian Real
Marko Yannik Stamm
Marc Torsten Politze – Captain
Erik Marcin Bukowski
Paul Schueler
Tobias Kreuzmann
Moritz Benedikt Oeler
Andreas Schlotterbeck
Dennis Eidner
Roger Kong

Group D

Playoff round

Quarterfinals

Classification 5–8 bracket

Seventh place game

References

Nations at the 2011 World Aquatics Championships
2011 in German sport
Germany at the World Aquatics Championships